The crossing of the Rhine River by a mixed group of barbarians which included Vandals, Alans and Suebi is traditionally considered to have occurred on the last day of the year 406 (December 31, 406). The crossing transgressed one of the Late Roman Empire's most secure limites or boundaries and so it was a climactic moment in the decline of the Empire. It initiated a wave of destruction of Roman cities and the collapse of Roman civic order in northern Gaul. That, in turn, occasioned the rise of three usurpers in succession in the province of Britannia. Therefore, the crossing of the Rhine is a marker date in the Migration Period during which various Germanic tribes moved westward and southward from southern Scandinavia and northern Germania.

Ancient sources 
Several written accounts document the crossing, supplemented by the time line of Prosper of Aquitaine, which gives a firm date of 31 December 406 in his year-by-year chronicle: "In the sixth consulship of Arcadius and Probus, Vandals and Alans came into the Gauls, having crossed the Rhine, on the day before the kalends of January." 

A letter by Jerome, written from Bethlehem and dated to the year 409, gives a long list of the barbarian tribes involved (Quadi, Vandals, Sarmatians, Alans, Gepids, Herules, Saxons, Burgundians, Alemanni and the armies of the Pannonians). Some of them, like Quadi and Sarmatians, are drawn from history or literary tradition. Jerome lists the cities now known as Mainz, Worms, Rheims, Amiens, Arras, Thérouanne, Tournai, Speyer and Strasbourg as having been pillaged.

In his History of the Franks, the 6th-century historian Gregory of Tours embedded some short passages of a  lost account by the 5th-century historian Renatus Profuturus Frigeridus of a war between the Vandals, Alans and Franks that took place in the neighbourhood of the Rhine around the time of the supposed crossing of the Rhine. This text, scholarly called the "Frigeridus fragment", may provide some clues about the circumstances preceding the crossing.

Olympiodorus of Thebes, a generally reliable contemporary historian, wrote an account of the crossing, of which only fragments have survived in quotations by Sozomen, Zosimus and Photius.

Orosius mentioned the crossing in passing.

Interpretation

Motives 

The initial gathering of barbarians on the east bank of the Rhine has been interpreted as a banding of refugees from the Huns or the remnants of Radagaisus' defeated Goths, without direct evidence. Scholars such as Walter Goffart and Guy Halsall have argued instead that the barbarian groups crossed the Rhine not (so much) because they were fleeing away from the Huns, but seized the opportunity to plunder and settle in Gaul when the Roman garrisons on the Rhine frontier were weakened or withdrawn in order to protect Italy. Peter Heather (2009), on the other hand, argued that this hypothesis does not explain all the evidence, such as the fact that 'the vast majority of the invaders who emerged from the middle Danubian region between 405 and 408 had not been living there in the fourth century', and that the evidence for any Roman military withdrawal from the northwest at this time is weak; escaping 'the Hun-generated chaos and predation' was still a better explanation.

Vandal–Frankish war 
According to the Frigeridus fragment, there was a war between the Franks and the Vandals, in which the latter were losing. MacDowall (2016) suggested this war may have consisted of several battles, wherein the Franks were trying to defend their own territory and/or the Roman frontier as foederati, while Vandals were trying to either obtain a similar foederati status as the Franks, Alemanni and Burgunds on the east bank, or trying to cross the Rhine. Frigeridus states that the Vandals lost around 20,000 warriors, including their king Godigisel, in these military engagements. When the Vandals' war situation was becoming desperate, the Alans (who he mistakenly labels Alamanni) came to the rescue of the Vandals, and the joint forces seem to have defeated the Franks in a decisive battle. Frigeridus does not mention a date nor a precise location for this battle; he only indicated that the Alan army 'turned away from the Rhine' in order to intervene in the Vandal–Frankish war, so it must have taken place some distance away from the river. MacDowall estimated that this last battle 'probably took place some time in the summer or autumn of 406, and it allowed the Vandals and their allies to move into Frankish territory on the middle Rhine'.

Despite this, and against contemporary military logic of staying in the winter quarters to await more favourable weather for their next campaign, Prosper claimed the Vandals and Alans crossed the Rhine in the middle of the winter, which MacDowall argues would only make sense if they were starving and desperate, and the lands they had just conquered from the Franks were insufficient to provide them with enough food for everyone.

Location 

Jerome mentions Mainz (Mogontiacum) first in his list of the cities devastated by the incursion, there was a Roman stone pillar bridge across the Rhine at Mainz called the Pons Ingeniosa at that time, and the Vandals may have been starving (given the fact that they crossed the Rhine in mid-winter) and therefore decided to raid Mainz in order to plunder its food supplies; this is why scholars such as MacDowall (2016) assume this to have been the location of the crossing of the Rhine. Worms (Vangionum) and Strasbourg (Argentoratum) are two other Roman cities on the Rhine reportedly sacked, so an initial traversal further to the south may seem equally plausible (if one is to assume that it was accompanied by plundering a city on the western bank, which isn't even necessary; these cities could have been pillaged any time between the 405/6 crossing and Jerome's 409 letter). On the other hand, the downstream river fortresses of Nijmegen (Noviomagus) and Cologne (Colonia) in the north were apparently left intact by the barbarians, as was Trier (Augusta Treverorum), situated just west of Mainz. As Jerome had lived in Trier until 370, it's very likely he would have reported it if the invaders had attacked his former hometown, but he makes no such mention.

Frozen Rhine? 
A frozen Rhine, making the crossing easier, is not attested by any contemporary source, but was a plausible surmise made by 18th-century historian Edward Gibbon. Although many later writers have since mentioned a frozen Rhine as if it were a fact, for Gibbon himself it was merely a hypothesis ('in a season when the waters of the Rhine were most probably frozen') to help explain why the Vandals, Alans and Suebi were able to cross the Rhine into Gaul with such apparent ease. It is also possible that they used a Roman Rhine bridge, or that the migrating peoples simply used boats.

Unguarded Rhine? 
It is not clear why the Germanic bands crossing the Rhine apparently met no organised military resistance on the Roman side. A common hypothesis is that Roman general Stilicho may have depleted the garrisons on the Rhine border in 402 to face the Visigothic invasion of Alaric I in Italy. Goffart argued in favour of this hypothesis based on the writings of the poet Claudian (died c. 404), who knew Stilicho personally; the general supposedly entrusted the defence of the Rhine frontier to the Franks and Alamanni, who were Roman foederati, for the time being until the Goths had been driven out of Italy. Furthermore, he interpreted the Frigeridus fragment as showing the Franks being initially successful in preventing the Vandals from crossing the Rhine, but that they could no longer hold them back when the Alans joined the fray. However, Heather (2009) pointed out that the evidence for any Roman military withdrawal from the northwest at this time is weak.

Alternative dating – Baynes and Kulikowski 
A 2000 article by Michael Kulikowski, finding that in traditional historiography "the sequence of events bristles with technical difficulties", bypassed modern historians' accounts, which he found to have depended upon Gibbon and one another, and reanalysed the literary sources. His conclusion was that a date for the mid-winter crossing of the Rhine of 31 December 405 offers a more coherent chronology of events in Belgica, Gaul and Britannia. However, Kulikowski's dating theory, which is a revival of arguments that were put forward by Norman H. Baynes, was forcefully challenged by Anthony Birley.

Problems with Prosper's account 
Kulikowski outlined how 406 came to be selected. The sixth consulship of Arcadius, with Probus as co-consul, corresponds to 406. Prosper noted the invasion of Italy by Radagaisus as the prime event of the previous year, as well as his death, which actually occurred in 406, and he correctly assigned to the next year (407) the usurpation of Constantine III. "The three entries are linked, and together they tell a kind of story", Kulikowski observed. "Prosper was writing a chronicle, and the genre abhorred blank years. Since his chosen genre demanded an entry for each of three years, Prosper simply portioned out his sequence of events, one event to the year. He does the same thing elsewhere in the chronicle".

Usurpation of Marcus 
Kulikowski noted a contradiction between Prosper's date and the assertions made by a fragment of Olympiodorus of Thebes, Zosimus's New History (vi.3.1) and Orosius that the Rhine crossing and the presence of barbarians in Gaul provoked the usurpation of Marcus in Britannia: the latter occurred in the course of 406, thus preceded the 31 December 406 date, and therefore the Rhine crossing must have happened earlier. Kulikowski's proposed date of 31 December 405 places the acclamation of the first of the usurpers in Britannia, which was characterised as a fearful reaction to the barbarian presence in Gaul, after the crossing of the Rhine.

Stilicho's inaction 
With the traditional date of 31 December 406 in mind, much has been made of the inaction of Stilicho, which is sometimes imputed to his strategy focussed on ambitions in Illyria. Kulikowski's date of 31 December 405 finds Stilicho fully occupied in Tuscia battling the forces of Radagaisus, who was not finally overcome (Battle of Faesulae (406)) and executed until August 406.

Aftermath 

According to bishop Hydatius of Aquae Flaviae, the barbarians crossed into Spain in September or October 409; little is known about the acts of the Vandals, Alans and Suevi in Gaul between the crossing of the Rhine and their invasion of Spain. Gregory of Tours only mentions that 'the Vandals left their own country and burst into the Gauls under king Gunderic. And when the Gauls had been thoroughly laid waste they made for the Spains. The Suebi, that is, [Alans], following them, seized Gallicia.' Based on Jerome's letter, Kulikowski argued that the Vandals, Alans and Suebi probably mostly stayed in northern Gaul until at least the spring of 409 (the earliest possible date of Jerome's letter), because almost all cities pillaged by the barbarians listed by Jerome were located in the north, and the southern city of Toulouse (Tolosa) had so far been able to repel the invaders, and they hadn't yet crossed into Spain.

Note

References

Sources

Drinkwater, John F., "The usurpers Constantine III (407–411) and Jovinus (411–413)", Britannia 29 (1998), 269–98.

Kulikowski, Michael, "Barbarians in Gaul, Usurpers in Britain", Britannia 31 (2000), 325–345.

Rhine
Rhine
Rhine
Migration Period
Rhine
406
5th century in Germany
400s in the Roman Empire
Germania Superior